Berkovski Prelogi is a small settlement just north of Berkovci in the Municipality of Križevci in northeastern Slovenia. The area is part of the traditional region of Styria. The entire municipality is now included in the Mura Statistical Region.

References

External links
Berkovski Prelogi on Geopedia

Populated places in the Municipality of Križevci